Ink is an American television sitcom which aired on CBS from October 21, 1996 to May 19, 1997 that starred real-life husband and wife Ted Danson and Mary Steenburgen as divorced newspaper journalists, allegedly inspired by the film His Girl Friday. The show was also produced by Danson and Steenburgen. The show was canceled after one season due to lower than expected ratings. The show's pilot was drastically changed and reshot from the original version. Ink was filmed at the soundstages of CBS Studio City in the Studio City area of Los Angeles. Outdoor scenes were usually shot at the small backlot streets of the same studio.

Plot
Journalists Kate Montgomery and Mike Logan married three months after meeting on the White House lawn. Although the marriage didn't last, there are two common threads between them—their 15-year-old daughter Abby and their all-consuming adoration of the newspaper ink that rubs off on their fingers. While Mike has become one of New York's larger-than-life journalists, Kate's hard-nosed reporting from around the world has earned her an impressive reputation. When Kate accepts a job offer that's just too good to pass up, she becomes the first female managing editor of the New York Sun—and she's now Mike's boss as well.

Her staff also includes no-nonsense, seen-it-all police reporter Ernie Trainor; intense and somewhat neurotic financial reporter Alan Mesnick; "On the Town" columnist Belinda Carhardt, who has a few miles on her; and the newsroom's jaded and judgmental editorial assistant Donna French, who manages to remain ultra-hip in a sea of tweeds and khakis.

Cast
Ted Danson as Mike Logan
Mary Steenburgen as Kate Montgomery
Alana Austin as Abby Logan
Christine Ebersole as Belinda Carhardt
Saul Rubinek as Alan Mesnick
Charlie Robinson as Ernie Trainor
Jenica Bergere as Donna French
Jonathan Katz as Leo

Episodes

Production 
The original concept from the show came from Jeffrey Lane, who came up with the idea. Lane abruptly exited, and a handful of showrunners came in, and settled on Diane English, who created Murphy Brown.

References

External links
Official Website

1990s American sitcoms
1996 American television series debuts
1997 American television series endings
CBS original programming
English-language television shows
Television series by DreamWorks Television
Television shows set in New York City
Television series created by Diane English